The 14th Massachusetts Regiment was raised on September 16, 1776, under Colonel Gamaliel Bradford at Boston, Massachusetts. The regiment would see action at the Battle of Saratoga and the Battle of Monmouth. The regiment was disbanded on January 1, 1781, at West Point, New York.  The Colonel's young son, Gamaliel Bradford III was a private in this regiment.

External links
Bibliography of the Continental Army in Massachusetts compiled by the United States Army Center of Military History

14th Massachusetts Regiment
Military units and formations established in 1775
Military units and formations disestablished in 1781